"Re-sublimity" is Kotoko's second maxi single under Geneon Entertainment, released on November 17, 2004. The title track was used as an opening theme for the anime series Kannazuki no Miko while "Agony", its B-side, was used as the ending theme. "Suppuration -core-" was used as a soundtrack for the anime and a rearrangement of the song "Suppuration" appears in her Hane Live Tour 2004 Limited Album. The single peaked at number eight on the Oricon charts and charted for 12 weeks. Since it sold 50,119 copies, this is considered Kotoko's best selling single.

Track listing 
Re-sublimity – 5:19
Composition: Kazuya Takase
Arrangement: Kazuya Takase
Lyrics: Kotoko
Agony – 4:22
Composition: Tomoyuki Nakazawa
Arrangement: Tomoyuki Nakazawa
Lyrics: Kotoko
Suppuration -core- – 5:37
Composition: Kazuya Takase
Arrangement: Kazuya Takase
Lyrics: Kotoko
Re-sublimity (Karaoke) – 5:18
Agony (Karaoke) – 4:21

Charts and sales

References

2004 singles
2004 songs
Kotoko (singer) songs
Anime songs
Song recordings produced by I've Sound
Songs with lyrics by Kotoko (musician)